Phasioormia is a genus of flies in the family Tachinidae.

Species
 Phasioormia bicornis (Malloch, 1932)
 Phasioormia pallida Townsend, 1933

References

Tachinidae